Hot Dixie Chick (foaled March 31, 2007) is an American Thoroughbred racehorse.

Background 
Hot Dixie Chick was foaled on March 31, 2007, at Gerry Dilger's Dromoland Farm near Lexington, Kentucky. She was sired by Dixie Union, a son of the stakes winner Dixieland Band, and she is out of the mare Above Perfection, by the Irish-bred stallion In Excess, making her a half sister to 2017 Kentucky Derby winner Always Dreaming.

Racing career

2009: two-year-old season 
Hot Dixie Chick broke her maiden in her second race, setting what was then the Churchill Downs track record for 5 furlongs on dirt in the process. In that race, she defeated future Breeders' Cup Juvenile Fillies Turf winner Tapitsfly. She then went on to win the 6-furlong, Grade III Schuylerville Stakes at Saratoga Race Course. In her next outing, she won the Grade I, 7-furlong Spinaway Stakes in stakes-record time of 1:22.28.

2010: three-year-old season 
Hot Dixie Chick raced three times as a three-year-old. Her first race was a win in the 6-furlong Prima Donna Stakes at Oaklawn Park on March 20, which she won by 5 3/4 lengths. She then finished her 3-year-old season with third-place finishes in both the Eight Belles Stakes and Winning Colors Stakes at Churchill Downs.

Offspring 
Hot Dixie Chick was bred to Curlin in 2011, and produced a colt named Union Jackson the following year on February 7, 2012. Trained by Steve Asmussen, Union Jackson placed 3rd in the Aristides Stakes at Churchill Downs on June 4, 2016.

She has also produced Marcy Darcy, a filly by Smart Strike born March 22, 2014, and an unnamed filly by Street Cry in 2015.

Pedigree 

Hot Dixie Chick is inbred 3 × 4 to Northern Dancer, meaning Northern Dancer appears once in the 3rd generation and once in the 4th generation of her pedigree.

References 

2007 racehorse births
Racehorses bred in Kentucky
Racehorses trained in the United States
Thoroughbred family 4-p